Janelly Fourtou (born 4 February 1939 in Paris) is a French politician and Member of the European Parliament for central France. She is a member of the Union for French Democracy, which is part of the Alliance of Liberals and Democrats for Europe, and sits on the European Parliament's Committee on Petitions and its Committee on the Internal Market and Consumer Protection.

She is also a substitute for the Committee on Legal Affairs, a member of the delegation to the EU–Chile Joint Parliamentary Committee, and a substitute for the delegation for relations with the countries of Central America.

Career
In 1972 Fourtou received a Master's degree in language and literature. She works as an assistant at the Paris Chamber of Commerce from 1960–1964, then was in charge of bookshop Maison de la Presse in Paris from 1965–1969.

She was elected as a member of Neuilly Municipal Council in 1983, and had responsibility for housing from 1989–1995, and responsibility for employment from 1995. She was elected as a Member of the European Parliament in 1999.

Fourtou has been active in the EU Parliaments decisions regarding intellectual property rights. In 2004, she led the passage of a directive "after unofficial meetings with the Council working group and
the Commission", suggesting among many other things up to four years of imprisonment for illegal file sharing. The directive also included an introduction of private police forces to enforce the law (in the EU member countries that should adopt the directive as-is).

Personal life
Fourtou is married to Jean-René Fourtou, the CEO of Vivendi Universal.

References

External links
 
 

1939 births
Living people
Politicians from Paris
Union for French Democracy MEPs
MEPs for France 1999–2004
MEPs for Massif-central–Centre 2004–2009
20th-century women MEPs for France
21st-century women MEPs for France